The 1986 Belgian motorcycle Grand Prix was the seventh round of the 1986 Grand Prix motorcycle racing season. It took place on the weekend of 4–6 July 1986 at the Circuit de Spa-Francorchamps.

Classification

500 cc

References

Belgian motorcycle Grand Prix
Belgian
Motorcycle Grand Prix